Lysophosphatidic acid receptor 1 also known as LPA1 is a protein that in humans is encoded by the LPAR1 gene. LPA1 is a G protein-coupled receptor that binds the lipid signaling molecule lysophosphatidic acid (LPA).

Function 

The integral membrane protein encoded by this gene is a lysophosphatidic acid (LPA) receptor from a group known as EDG receptors. These receptors are members of the G protein-coupled receptor superfamily. Utilized by LPA for cell signaling, EDG receptors mediate diverse biologic functions, including proliferation, platelet aggregation, smooth muscle contraction, inhibition of neuroblastoma cell differentiation, chemotaxis, and tumor cell invasion. Alternative splicing of this gene has been observed and two transcript variants have been described, each encoding identical proteins. An alternate translation start codon has been identified, which results in isoforms differing in the N-terminal extracellular tail. In addition, an alternate polyadenylation site has been reported.

Cancer
LPAR1 gene has been detected progressively overexpressed in Human papillomavirus-positive neoplastic keratinocytes derived from uterine cervical preneoplastic lesions at different levels of malignancy. For this reason, this gene is likely to be associated with tumorigenesis and may be a potential prognostic marker for uterine cervical preneoplastic lesions progression.

See also
 Lysophospholipid receptor

References

Further reading

External links

 

G protein-coupled receptors